Vic Wilson may refer to:

 Vic Wilson (cricketer) (1921–2008), English cricketer
 Vic Wilson (racing driver) (1931–2001), British racing driver